Geoffrey Michael Alatiit Eigenmann (born March 23, 1985), known professionally as Geoff Eigenmann, is a Filipino actor, host and model notable for his performances in television; he is a member of the Eigenmann family of actors and the son of Actor and Director, Michael De Mesa.

Biography
Eigenmann is a third generation member of the Eigenmann family of actors. His grandparents are music icon Eddie Mesa and actress Rosemarie Gil. He is son of award-winning Filipino actors Michael de Mesa and Gina Alajar. He has two siblings who are actors: older brother Ryan Eigenmann and younger brother AJ Eigenmann. Geoff is nephew of Filipino actors Mark Gil and Cherie Gil and cousin of actors Gabby Eigenmann and Sid Lucero (Tim Eigenmann), Andrea "Andi" Eigenmann, and Maxine Eigenmann.

Early career
Geoff's first TV appearance was a kid-teen oriented comedy gag show, Ang TV on ABS-CBN in 1992, that was his first career in acting.

Education
Geoff attended International Christian Academy for middle school, as did his brother Ryan. Eigenmann graduated high school from Shekinah Christian Training Center in March 2002.

Hosting
Aside from Rosalinda, Geoff has co-hosted ASAP and a reality variety talent show Palmolive Shining Circle Of 10 Batch 2008 on ABS-CBN; then he hosted as a VJ of MYX from 2005 to 2007. Geoff transferred to GMA Network and he hosted SOP Rules from 2008 to 2010 and a former mainstay host Party Pilipinas on GMA Network from 2010 to 2013.

Career

TV career
Eigenman went back in his home network GMA Network via SRO Cinemaserye in June 2008.

The SRO Cinemaserye: Ganti Ng Puso ended in 2009 and Geoff was supposed to appear again via Sine Novela: Kung Aagawin Mo Man Ang Lahat Sa Akin but he was replaced by JC Tiuseco to work with Maxene Magalona.

Recently in 2009, he's playing the role of Fernando Jose, leading man to Carla Abellana, in the Philippine version of Rosalinda.

A recent project will be a romantic-comedy episode of SRO Cinemaserye with his on-screen sweetheart Carla Abellana. They will work for the second time with their parents, Rey "PJ" Abellana and Gina Alajar.

Geoff was part of a reality show with his partner Carla Abellana for their newest GMA Christmas reality show, Puso ng Pasko: Artista Challenge. Geoff's former loveteam and long-time friend Heart Evangelista was paired with newcomer Ervic Vijandre. This was Geoff and Carla's fifth time together.

Geoff is also a part of Sine Novela Presents: Basahang Ginto with his partner, Carla Abellana, it was aired on GMA Network.

In 2011, Geoff was also part of a fantasy comedy together again with his partner, Carla Abellana for their team up again in Magic Palayok. This was their fourth time to work since their drama mini series, Basahang Ginto a Sine Novela show on GMA Network.

In 2012, Geoff will be paired with his former love team Heart Evangelista in a GMA Network drama, Legacy. This will be their reunion after working individually for a long time. Also the same year, Geoff has also a part of former drama series on daytime, Kasalanan Bang Ibigin Ka? with his co-stars Jackie Rice, Jennica Garcia and his real life father Michael de Mesa.

In 2016 and 2018, Geoff went back to ABS-CBN as he returns to GMA Network in 2017. Today, Geoff is now a freelance artist. 

In 2019, he joined The Killer Bride starring Villa Estrella co-star Maja Salvador. In 2021, he joins the casts of FPJ's Ang Probinsyano.

Movie career
Eigenmann's first movie was Batang X via Regal Entertainment in 1995. Eigenmann was a contract star of Star Cinema. His second movie was Bcoz Of U with his then-girlfriend Heart Evangelista. His 3rd movie was the comedy First Day High, based on a deodorant commercial for Rexona with his Kapamilya stars Kim Chiu, Gerald Anderson, Jason Abalos, Carla Humpries and Maja Salvador.

His fourth movie and his first indie film was Anak Ni Brocka with the late hip hop artist Francis Magalona in 2005. His fifth movie was For The First Time with fellow Kapuso star Richard Gutierrez and Kapamilya Star KC Concepcion. His sixth and last movie for Star Cinema was the horror Villa Estrella with Maja Salvador, Shaina Magdayao and John Estrada.

He is a former contract star with GMA Films, his seventh movie and first movie for GMA Films was Ang Panday with fellow Kapuso stars Sen. Bong Revilla, Buboy Villar and Rhian Ramos. A co-production with Imus Productions, Ang Panday was part of the 2009 Metro Manila Film Festival where the movie won as "1st Place Best Festival Picture".

Filmography

Television

Films

Personal life 
Geoff Eigenmann married his longtime partner Maya Flores on February 22, 2022.

References

External links

1985 births
Living people
Filipino people of Kapampangan descent
People from Parañaque
Male actors from Metro Manila
Geoff
Star Magic
Filipino male models
VJs (media personalities)
GMA Network personalities
People from Capiz
Visayan people